Phenopelopidae is a family of oribatid mites in the order Sarcoptiformes. As of 2018, there were 4 genera and 106 species known in this family.

Description 
Adult mites of this family are 400-900 μm long and usually dark brown to almost black in colour, but light brown individuals also occur. They can be distinguished from other oribatid families by: flat and blade-like lamellae (ridges of cuticle between the dorsal trichobothria); elongate pelopsiform or normally developed chelicerae with small chelae; notogaster with a broad anterior tectum, overhanging insertions of interlamellar setae and bothridia; with movable pteromorphs and well- or poorly-circumscribed lenticulus; porose areas small or rarely with saccules, all closely associated with some of the notogastral setae; with eight or 10 pairs of notogastral setae; and custodium broad.

The juvenile stages (larvae and nymphs) differ from adults in being smaller, soft-bodied, light brown and having plicate (folded or crumpled) cuticle. However, juveniles have only been studied for a few species of Phenopelopidae.

These mites are covered in numerous setae, which vary among species and among life stages within species. A typical feature of Phenopelopidae is the presence of long, thick setae on some leg segments. Juveniles of some species have long marginal setae, possibly as protection against small predators.

Ecology 
Phenopelopidae have been collected from leaf litter underneath trees, moss, a forest meadow, at the edge of a bog, grass and woodland. They appear to be fungal feeders, but at least one species can feed on living plant material.

Genera
Below is a list of the genera in this family, along with their authorities, years of publication and distributions.
 Eupelops Ewing, 1917 - cosmopolitan
 Nesopelops Hammer, 1973 - Oceanic, Oriental
 Peloptulus Berlese, 1908 - Holarctic, Neotropical, Oriental
 Propelops Jacot, 1937 - Holarctic

References

Further reading

 
 
 
 

Sarcoptiformes
Acari families